The following Confederate States Army units and commanders fought in the Battle of Chantilly of the American Civil War on September 1, 1862. The Union order of battle is shown separately.

Abbreviations used

Military rank
 MG = Major General
 BG = Brigadier General
 Col = Colonel
 Ltc = Lieutenant Colonel
 Maj = Major
 Cpt = Captain

Other
 (k) = killed

Army of Northern Virginia

Left Wing
MG Thomas Jackson

Cavalry

References

 Taylor, Paul. He Hath Loosed the Fateful Lightning: The Battle of Ox Hill (Chantilly), September 1, 1862. White Mane Books: Shippensburg, Pennsylvania, 2003. 

American Civil War orders of battle